San Giorgio della Richinvelda (Standard Friulian: ;
It has a population of 4,626 inhabitants divided in the seven small towns that compose the municipality: Rauscedo, Domanins, Cosa, Pozzo, Provesano, Aurava and San Giorgio. 
Agriculture represents the most common activity of the territory.

Notable people 
 Donato Casella, renaissance sculptor from Carona
 Pim Fortuyn, Dutch politician, sociologist, author and professor, assassinated during the Dutch general election of 2002, owned a holiday home in the town and is buried in the cemetery of the frazione Provesano.
 Gino Pancino, cyclist
 Tarcisio Petracco
 Bertram of St. Genesius, Patriarch of Aquileia, assassinated during an ambush at San Giorgio della Richinvelda on 6 June 1350.

References

External links
 Official website

Cities and towns in Friuli-Venezia Giulia